Megoura is a genus of aphid.

References

Sternorrhyncha genera
Macrosiphini